Neomogroside is a cucurbitane glycoside isolated from the fruit of Siraitia grosvenorii.

See also 
 Mogroside
 Siamenoside

References

External links

Triterpene glycosides
Sugar substitutes